Baron Tedder, of Glenguin in the County of Stirling, is a title in the Peerage of the United Kingdom. It was created in 1946 for Marshal of the Royal Air Force, Sir Arthur Tedder. His second son, the second Baron, was Purdie Professor of Chemistry at the University of St Andrews.  the title is held by the latter's son, the third Baron, who succeeded in 1994.

Sir Arthur John Tedder, father of the first Baron, was Commissioner of the Board of Customs and devised the old age pension scheme.

Barons Tedder (1946)
Arthur William Tedder, 1st Baron Tedder (1890–1967)
John Michael Tedder, 2nd Baron Tedder (1926–1994)
Robin John Tedder, 3rd Baron Tedder (b. 1955)

The heir apparent is the present holder's son Hon. Benjamin John Tedder (b. 1985).

Arms

References

Kidd, Charles, Williamson, David (editors). Debrett's Peerage and Baronetage (1990 edition). New York: St Martin's Press, 1990.

Baronies in the Peerage of the United Kingdom
Noble titles created in 1946